Joshua William Kay (born 30 January 1997) is an English professional footballer who plays as a midfielder for club Barrow.

Career

AFC Fylde
Kay joined AFC Fylde's academy programme from Squires Gate in the summer of 2015 and made his senior debut in a 2-0 FA Trophy victory over Warrington Town on 28 November 2015. He subsequently earned himself places on the bench for several National League North games, as well as the next round of the FA Trophy against Skelmersdale United.

Barnsley
Kay joined EFL Championship team Barnsley's youth team from Fylde in February 2016 and made his debut in a Championship match against Bristol City on 29 October 2016. He also spent time on loan at former club Fylde in March 2017, playing one game, and at Tranmere Rovers in November 2017, where he played two games, in addition to a trial game with Blackburn Rovers Under-23s in October 2017.

Chesterfield
Kay joined EFL League Two side Chesterfield on 4 January 2018. He made his debut in a 4–0 defeat against Accrington Stanley on 6 January 2018. His contract was not renewed by Chesterfield at the end of the 2017–18 season.

Barrow
Following his release, Kay signed a two-year contract for National League side Barrow on 26 June 2018, joining former Chesterfield caretaker-manager Ian Evatt at the Cumbria club. Kay formed part of the National League title winning side of 2020.

Career statistics

References

1996 births
Living people
Chesterfield F.C. players
Barrow A.F.C. players
Barnsley F.C. players
Tranmere Rovers F.C. players
Squires Gate F.C. players
AFC Fylde players
Sportspeople from Blackpool
English Football League players
National League (English football) players
Association football midfielders
English footballers